Stokes Township, Minnesota could refer to the following places:

Stokes Township, Itasca County, Minnesota
Stokes Township, Roseau County, Minnesota

See also
Stokes Township (disambiguation)

Minnesota township disambiguation pages